FM Yokohama 84.7  is a radio station based in Yokohama, Japan owned by the Yokohama FM Broadcasting Company, a joint venture of Nippon Broadcasting System, Kanagawa Prefectural Government and Bank of Yokohama. This station was featured in the Xbox game Project Gotham Racing 2.

Radio in Japan
Companies based in Yokohama
Mass media in Yokohama